Johnny Royal (born John Michael Herrera, June 12, 1976) is an American film director and composer.

His work as a director includes 33 & Beyond: The Royal Art of Freemasonry, as well as numerous commercial spots across various industries.

As a composer, Royal is best known as the founding member of the industrial rock band Black Lodge, and for his compositions, which have appeared on numerous hit television series including VH1, The Chelsea Handler Show, and LA Ink. He has written with several notable musicians including Jeordie White aka Twiggy Ramirez, Gilby Clarke, Sean Beavan, and Grammy-nominated producer Johnny K.

Personal life
In September 2015, LA Weekly reported that Royal was dating Carmen Electra.

Filmography (as writer, director, and producer)
 33 & Beyond: The Royal Art of Freemasonry (2017)
Illuminated: The True Story of the Illuminati (2019)

Filmography (as actor)
 Longmire - actor (2017)
 33 & Beyond: The Royal Art of Freemasonry - himself (2017)
 Chelsea Lately – himself (2007)
 VH1: The Fashion Team – himself (2007)

Discography
 33 & Beyond: The Royal Art of Freemasonry - composer (2017)
 Black Lodge: Self-Titled (2013)
 LA Ink – composer (2008)
 Chelsea Lately – composer (2007)
 VH1: The Fashion Team – composer (2007)

References

Living people
1976 births
American television composers
American film score composers
American film directors
American rock guitarists